Piriona is a genus of parasitic flies in the family Tachinidae. There is one described species in Piriona, P. fasciculata.

Distribution
Argentina, Chile.

References

Diptera of South America
Dexiinae
Tachinidae genera
Taxa named by John Merton Aldrich
Monotypic Brachycera genera